Colli Verdi is a comune (municipality) in the province of Pavia, Lombardy, northern Italy. It was formed on 1 January 2019 by the merger of the previous comuni of Canevino, Ruino and Valverde.

References

Cities and towns in Lombardy